Adéjùmọ̀ is a surname of Yoruba origin, meaning "the crown or royalty comes together alike (to collaborate)".

Notable people with the surname include:
 Olusegun Adejumo, Nigerian visual artist
 Raheem Adejumo, Nigerian philanthropist, businessman and administrator
 Soji Adejumo,  Nigerian Professor of animal physiology and politician